The first USS Caprice (SP-703) was a United States Navy patrol vessel in commission from 1917 to 1919.

Caprice was built in 1914 as a private motorboat of the same name by the Electric Launch Company (ELCO) at Bayonne, New Jersey. In May 1917, the U.S. Navy acquired her under a free lease from her owner, William Sloan of Norfolk, Virginia, for use as a section patrol boat during World War I. She was commissioned as USS Caprice (SP-703) on 24 August 1917.

Assigned to the 5th Naval District, Caprice carried out patrol duties for the rest of World War I.

Caprice was decommissioned on 24 January 1919 and returned to Sloan the same day.

References

Department of the Navy Naval History and Heritage Command Online Library of Selected Images: Civilian Ships: Caprice (American Motor Boat, 1914). Served as USS Caprice (SP-703) in 1917–1919
NavSource Online: Section Patrol Craft Photo Archive Caprice (SP 703)

Patrol vessels of the United States Navy
World War I patrol vessels of the United States
Ships built in Bayonne, New Jersey
1914 ships